Saint Leo the Great School can refer to:

Saint Leo the Great School (Pennsylvania), Lancaster, Pennsylvania, United States
St. Leo the Great School (San Jose), San Jose, California, United States

See also
Pope Leo I (400–461), also known as Saint Leo the Great